Lieutenant-Colonel William Osborne Smith (1833 – 11 May 1887) served as the first Acting Commissioner of the North-West Mounted Police, from 25 September to 17 October 1873.

Biography 
Osborne Smith was born to W. H. Smith of Hendreowen (West Glamorgan), Wales. He was commissioned into the British Army's 39th Foot in 1855. He served in the Crimea and came to the province of Canada with his regiment in 1856. He married Janet Colquhoun of Montreal in 1858. When his unit was transferred to Bermuda in 1859, Osborne Smith, then a lieutenant, sold his commission and became a merchant in Montreal. He later became a lieutenant-colonel in the Canadian Militia.

Osborne Smith carries the distinction of having the only regimental number that carries a fraction.  His number was 2.5.

He returned to Wales and died in Swansea in 1887.

Legacy 
A neighbourhood in Winnipeg is named after Osborne. The Osborne Village is part of the federal riding of Winnipeg South Centre and a major area of cultural influence, including the gay village.

External links

Canadian Militia officers
People of the Fenian raids
District of Keewatin councillors
Royal Canadian Mounted Police commissioners
39th Regiment of Foot officers
British Army personnel of the Crimean War
Welsh emigrants to pre-Confederation Canada
1833 births
1887 deaths

Victoria Rifles of Canada
Winnipeg Light Infantry